Tandav is an Indian political thriller web series on Amazon Prime Video, created, directed and produced by Ali Abbas Zafar, in his digital debut, with the script being written by Gaurav Solanki. The series has an ensemble cast featuring Saif Ali Khan, Sunil Grover, Tigmanshu Dhulia, Dimple Kapadia, Mohammed Zeeshan Ayyub, Dino Morea and Anup Soni. The series is about the dark corners of Indian politics, where people who will go to any lengths in pursuit of power.

Principal shoot of Tandav began in October 2019, with filming mostly took place across the Pataudi Palace in Haryana, and Delhi. The series has cinematography handled by Karol Stadnik and edited by Steven H. Bernard; the background score is composed by Julius Packiam. The series premiered through the streaming platform Amazon Prime Video on 15 January 2021.

Premise 
The charismatic leader of a premiere political party known as Janata Lok Dal (JLD), Samar Pratap Singh (Saif Ali Khan) feels he's ready to inherit the chair of PM but Samar's father, the party patriarch and the PM, Devki Nandan Singh (Tigmanshu Dhulia), isn't willing to retire yet. Anuradha Kishore, Devki's close associate (Dimple Kapadia) and party senior leader Gopal Das (Kumud Mishra) are few of many other leaders considering themselves fit to sit in this chair. But this chair never comes easily, they must constantly keep striving for it. A parallel story is that of the idealistic campus activist Shiva Shekhar (Mohammed Zeeshan Ayyub) who becomes an overnight icon as he shines at a political event. Shiva now wants to bring the change, sway the youth, overthrow the power pillars – he knows the sweet taste of power. And power corrupts. Shiva and Samar will meet as country politics will cross roads with youth politics. Tandav is the coming together of a series of manipulations that exposes layers of human greed, ambition, love, vulnerability, and violence.

Cast
 Saif Ali Khan as Samar Pratap Singh, the son of a three-term Prime Minister, Devki Nandan Singh
 Dimple Kapadia as Anuradha Kishore, an old friend of Devki Nandan Singh
 Sunil Grover as Gurpal Singh
 Mohammed Zeeshan Ayyub as Shiva Shekhar, student in VNU
 Anup Soni as Kailash Kumar
 Kritika Kamra as Sana Mir, student in VNU
 Sarah Jane Dias as Ayesha Pratap Singh, wife of Samar Pratap Singh
 Gauahar Khan as Maithili Sharan, Anuradha's Personal Assistant
 Dino Morea as Professor Jigar Sampath
 Sandhya Mridul as Professor Sandhya Nigam
 Tigmanshu Dhulia as Devki Nandan Singh, father of Samar Pratap Singh and Raghu Kishore Singh
 Priyal Mahajan as Rhea Pratap Singh, daughter of Samar Pratap Singh and Ayesha Pratap Singh
 Neha Hinge as Garima Deswal
 Parv Kaila as Vishal Awasthi
 Kumud Mishra as Gopal Das Munshi
 Paresh Pahuja as Raghu Kishore Singh, son of Anuradha Kishore
 Kritika Avasthi as Richa Avasthi
 Tasneem Khan as Disha Kapoor
 Shonali Nagrani as Aditi Mishra
 Amyra Dastur as Ada Mir
 Hiten Tejwani as Ajay Ahluwalia, Editor at NNN
 Sukhmani Sadana as Divya Ahluwalia, Doctor
 Jaimin Panchal as Protestor in VNU
 Manju Bahuguna as Farmer 2 
 Bhavna Choudhary as Preeti Singh
 Sunny Prajapati as Election Volunteer

Episodes

Production

Development 
Vijay Subramaniam, head of content for Amazon Prime Video India, announced six Indian originals, at the Television Critics Association's press tour held in California in February 2019, which also included Ali Abbas Zafar's maiden web series as well. It is touted to be a political drama film which explores "the dark corners of Indian politics, where powerful politicians, and those who aspire to be, sow chaos and manipulate others to control the country, ruthless pragmatism contrasts with the frustrations and aspirations of contemporary India and the ideals of the country's youth".

Zafar teamed up with Gaurav Solanki to write the script which took a year to complete. Zafar eventually sent a rough one-page draft to which he discussed with Amazon Prime Video before Solanki expanded it into a full-fledged series. He wrote three drafts for eight episodes.

In an interview with Indian Express, Gaurav Solanki stated "Tandav, which will be majorly shot in Delhi, is centred around the power corridors of Indian politics. Along with it, there is also a story about an institute, which is on the lines of JNU (Jawaharlal Nehru University). These two stories clash and so do their protagonists. One is a student activist and the other is a huge political leader."

Casting 
According to Zafar, the series consists of an ensemble cast which has 11-12 primary characters. Zafar initially planned to bring in big names for the cast, as Saif Ali Khan eventually accepted to play the lead protagonist, Samar Pratap Singh. It marks Saif's second web series, after Netflix's Sacred Games. Saif will be shown to be a Chanakya-like political leader who is also the central character of the series.

Saif initially stated, "My character is a politician who tends to talk a lot in public places and so there were a lot of Sanskrit-ized Hindi speeches that I had to prepare for Samar's character. The fun fact here is – I absolutely love speaking Sanskrit. At times we have a heavy shooting day and there are times when we have a lighter day. In this show, I had to speak almost 4 Sanskrit speeches every day. So I had to learn a lot of heavy duty lines."

Dimple Kapadia plays the parallel lead role of Anuradha Kishore, who competes against Samar to become the prime minister. Mohammed Zeeshan Ayyub, plays Shiva Shekhar who is seen essaying the role of a budding politician. Sunil Grover essays the role of Gurpal Chauhan. The supporting cast consists of Sarah-Jane Dias, Kritika Kamra, Kritika Avasthi, Anup Soni and Gauahar Khan.

Filming
Principal shooting of the series was kickstarted in October 2019. Tandav was mostly shot in Pataudi Palace, Haryana, with Saif stating that "We have shot a lot of sequences for the show in the palace. I have spent maximum time in the palace than anywhere in the world. It's my home so it was extremely comfortable shooting there. I never mind giving it for shoots especially when I am working in any project. It is almost unused for 340 days. I like to think of it as commercial property and am happy to rent it out. But it does make me little bit nervous when the crew moves in. It was a pleasure staying there and shooting there." Rest of the scenes were shot at the Imperial Hotel in Delhi.

It was revealed that most of the shoot had been completed before the government imposed the COVID-19 pandemic lockdown in India in March 2020. As of June 2020, Zafar stated that "The post-production work is under completion, with edit work was underway. As a lot of the work can be done online, it is keeping me busy."

Music
The background score of the series is composed by Julius Packiam. The series also features an adapted song of "Dhakka Laga Bukka", composed by A. R. Rahman, from the Mani Ratnam-directorial Yuva (2004). On adapting the song, Rahman stated "Abbas Ali called me and said the song was the centre of the whole series. So I said why don't we tweak the lyrics because they were written for something else. So we got together with the lyricist Mehboob Alam and he wrote an extra antara. Now we have a new intro for the song. We were careful about not changing too much of the original. You get a certain magic in the mix of things. This song has aggression, a sense of melody and harmony." The adapted version which had vocals by A. R. Rahman and Nakul Abhyankar, was released directly in YouTube on 13 January 2021.

Release 
Amazon Prime Video, announced 20 Indian originals scheduled for a release in 2020, with Tandav being one of them. However, the release was postponed to 2021, citing production delays due to COVID-19 pandemic.

The first teaser of Tandav was released through YouTube on 17 December 2020. On 28 December 2020, posters featuring Saif Ali Khan, Dimple Kapadia, Mohammed Zeeshan Ayyub, Sunil Grover, Gauhar Khan, Kritika Kamra, Sarah Jane Dias and Kumud Misra were released. A new poster was released on 3 January 2021, followed by the trailer on 4 January. The series premiered through Amazon Prime Video on 15 January 2021.

Reception

Critical response
Writing for The Hindu, Sayan Ghosh called "The series is riddled with cliched tropes and larger-than-life figures, that only provides a glimpse at the project's lost potential". Saibal Chatterjee of NDTV rated the series two out of five stars, writing "Tandav dances to a typically facile Bollywood beat. It presents a cliched take on power-crazy politicians that tells us nothing that we do not already know." Nairita Mukherjee of India Today reviewed "Tandav perhaps intended to be India's House of Cards - suave and well-dressed politicians, with evil brewing inside. But it falls, like that proverbial house of cards." Rohit Vats of News18 gave two out of five stating "The show may pick up in later episodes but first five display all the trappings of a ‘masala’ Bollywood production with absolutely nothing to ponder about once it's over."

Swetha Ramakrishnan of Firstpost rated one-and-a-half out of five reviewed "Tandav should have really been about Gurpal and Maithli's stories. About how these invisible characters who are actually running the political show conspire to make or break governments with their polity, wit and intelligence. Instead, what we get is a poorly researched, campy series that prefers to dumb down its plot assuming Indian audiences need to be spoon-fed Indian politics." Saraswati Datar of The News Minute reviewed "Tandav could have been a gripping political drama that took us into the dark and self-serving alleys of politics and allowed us to understand what it is about political power that makes it so intoxicating. Instead, we get a soap opera that does Tandav with two left feet."

In a positive note, Renuka Vyahare of The Times of India gave three out of five stars and stated "It is engaging but has no bearing on real life, isn't mentally stimulating and gives an impression that you know what's happening in the world, when you don't." Nandini Ramanath of Scroll.in reviewed "Beyond the show's realm lies a forgotten country. But to get there, viewers will need to wait for the events of Tandav to translate into something more meaningful than a game of thrones."

Controversy
The series caused controversy as several leaders of the Bharatiya Janata Party called for its ban and accused the makers and actors of hurting the religious sentiments of Hindus and mocking the Hindu God Shiva in one of the episodes and also described it as being anti-Dalit as a reason for the ban. Following the controversy, Ali Abbas Zafar offered an unconditional apology on behalf of the cast and crew of the show, and said he would make changes in the web-series owing to the concerns raised by the Information and Broadcasting Ministry regarding some portions of the show. Separate FIRs were filed in Uttar Pradesh, Madhya Pradesh, Karnataka and Maharashtra under Sections 153A and 295 of Indian Penal Code (IPC).

References

External links

2021 Indian television series debuts
Amazon Prime Video original programming
Hindi-language television shows
Hinduism in pop culture-related controversies